Winedale is an unincorporated community in Fayette County, Texas, United States.

The community was originally named Truebsal and was located in Washington County; in 1879 the post office had the name Winedale. In 1881 the post office closed and at a certain point of time the community moved north into Fayette County.

External links
 WINEDALE, TX Handbook of Texas Online.

Unincorporated communities in Fayette County, Texas
Unincorporated communities in Texas
German-American history
Geography of Washington County, Texas